Ford Rock is a prominent rock which lies  northeast of Cone Hill on Hut Point Peninsula, Ross Island, Antarctica. Cone Hill and this rock were designated "Cone Hill I" and "Cone Hill II," respectively, by the British Antarctic Expedition, 1910–13, under Robert Falcon Scott. Cone Hill has been approved for Scott's "Cone Hill I," but a new name suggested by A.J. Heine has been substituted for this prominent rock. M.R.J. Ford, a New Zealand surveyor, established a survey beacon network for the McMurdo Ice Shelf Project, 1962–63. A survey beacon was established earlier on this rock by a U.S. Hydrographic Office survey team, 1955–56.

References 

Hills of Ross Island